"You Know What I Mean" is a song released by The Turtles in 1967. The song spent 11 weeks on the Billboard Hot 100 chart, peaking at No. 12, while reaching No. 6 on Canada's "RPM 100", and No. 13 on Canada's CHUM Hit Parade.

Chart performance

References

1967 songs
1967 singles
The Turtles songs
Songs written by Alan Gordon (songwriter)